Dermoloma cuneifolium is a species of fungus in the family Tricholomataceae, and the type species of the genus Dermoloma. Originally named Agaricus cuneifolius by Elias Magnus Fries in 1818, it was transferred to Dermoloma by Marcel Bon in 1986.

References

External links

Tricholomataceae
Taxa named by Elias Magnus Fries